The 2013–14 Penn Quakers men's basketball team represented the University of Pennsylvania during the 2013–14 NCAA Division I men's basketball season. The Quakers, led by fifth year head coach Jerome Allen, played their home games at The Palestra and are members of the Ivy League. They finished the season 8–20, 5–9 in Ivy League play to finish in a tie for sixth place.

Roster

Schedule

|-
!colspan=9 style="background:#95001A; color:#01256E;"| Regular season

References

Penn Quakers men's basketball seasons
Penn
Penn Quakers
Penn Quakers